Anatoli Fyodorovich Polosin (30 August 1935 – 11 September 1997) was a Russian professional football coach.

Career
Polosin led three clubs through promotion to the top division of Soviet or Russian football: SC Tavriya Simferopol, FC Chornomorets Odesa and FC Shinnik Yaroslavl. He also managed the Indonesia national football team from 1987 to 1991, where he helped nurturing Indonesia's Golden Generation that became one of Southeast Asia's best during that times.

Honours

Manager
SC Tavriya Simferopol
 Soviet First League: 1980

FC Chornomorets Odesa
 Soviet First League: 1987

Indonesia
 Southeast Asian Games Gold medal: 1991

References

External links
 

1935 births
1997 deaths
Sportspeople from Tashkent
Soviet football managers
Soviet expatriate football managers
Russian football managers
FC Karpaty Lviv managers
SC Tavriya Simferopol managers
FC Rostov managers
FC Zimbru Chișinău managers
FC Astana-1964 managers
FK Köpetdag Aşgabat managers
FC Chornomorets Odesa managers
FC Fakel Voronezh managers
FC Shinnik Yaroslavl managers
Russian Premier League managers
FC SKA Rostov-on-Don managers
Indonesia national football team managers
FC Arsenal Tula managers
Expatriate football managers in Indonesia
Soviet expatriate sportspeople in Indonesia